Labidochromis textilis is a species of cichlid endemic to Lake Malawi where it is found along the central portion of the eastern coast.  This species grows to a length of  SL.

References

textilis
Fish described in 1975
Taxonomy articles created by Polbot